"The Yoko Factor" is the 20th episode of season 4 of the television show Buffy the Vampire Slayer.

Plot

Colonel McNamara discusses with a superior how to get Riley back in the Initiative under his command and how to deal with Buffy. Spike tells Adam that Buffy is going to be difficult to defeat and he should not underestimate her. Spike talks about having already killed two Slayers (Xin Rong and Nikki Wood), yet having been unable to kill Buffy, especially because of the Initiative chip now in his head. The two plan to separate Buffy from her Slayerette friends.

Still upset about what happened between her and Angel during her visit to Los Angeles, Buffy returns from L.A. to her empty dorm room. Xander brings Riley some clothes, and they talk about their mutual distaste for Angel, Riley having been told by Buffy about her previous relationship with him. However, it emerges that she has not told him the whole truth; while Riley was aware that Angel lost his soul and became Angelus, Xander tells Riley that having sex with Buffy was the trigger that set Angelus free.

Spike visits Giles at home and offers him files inside the Initiative. Spike tells Giles that Buffy does not respect her former Watcher anymore, which upsets Giles and causes him to turn to drink. Willow and Tara play with their new kitten, Miss Kitty Fantastico, while planning their class schedule for next year. They also talk about future housing plans, but Willow has not talked with Buffy yet and is unsure what she wants to do now that things have changed so much.

Riley visits Buffy; using a radio, he has tapped into the Initiative and is aware of their actions. She mentions that Angel upset her, but she is focusing on seeking Adam, and Riley leaves. Xander and Anya bring Spike fatigues to wear and a gun. Spike enthusiastically tries to shoot Xander, only for the chip to go off in his head; the chip does not allow Spike to point weapons at people and the gun was fake. Spike makes Xander feel unwanted by convincing him that the rest of the gang does not feel he is useful.

Buffy goes patrolling and runs into Forrest, who is also looking for Adam. They argue as they go into a cave and find Adam, who launches a surprise attack. Buffy and Adam exchange a few punches and kicks: Forrest tries to step in and help, but he is pushed away by Buffy. Adam hurls the Slayer against the cave wall, and Forrest uses the opening to shoot Adam with his stun rifle. Instead of harming him, however, the voltage merely seems to refresh Adam, who then disarms and fatally stabs Forrest with his bone skewer. Her will to fight gone, Buffy flees from the cave, with Adam taking pot shots at her. Running for her life, Buffy trips and tumbles down the side of a hill; she strikes her head on a rock, knocking her unconscious.

Meanwhile, having supposedly sneaked into the Initiative to retrieve some information, Spike charges into Giles's place with the disks. However, Giles is drunk so Willow tries to decrypt the disks. Spike talks to Willow and Tara about their Wicca interest and how her friends do not seem to support it. Willow thinks he means that their friends are not accepting their romantic relationship.

Riley hears of trouble on the streets through his radio. He finds Angel fighting the commandos, and Riley refuses to let Angel go see Buffy. The two have a brutal fight, of which Angel is clearly the victor. Both run off when a military truck arrives.

Buffy returns to her dorm room and Angel shows up. As Angel speaks with Buffy, Riley barges in and raises a gun to Angel. Angel taunts Riley and the two come to blows again. Buffy separates them and wants to talk to Angel alone. Buffy scolds Angel, yet they laugh when Angel confesses he came to make up. Buffy also apologizes for being bossy. The two part on friendly terms, although Angel tells her that he does not like Riley. Riley is worried that Buffy has reunited with Angel and confesses he has learned how Angel can become Angelus. They profess their love to each other, but Buffy must give him the bad news that Forrest is dead. Riley is distraught and leaves.

Spike reports back to Adam, happy to have split up the Scooby Gang, and the damage becomes clear when their meeting at Giles's home turns into a fight. While Tara and Anya hide in the bathroom, Buffy scolds Xander for telling Riley details about her and Angel's relationship and argues that she is going to take on Adam alone. Xander complains that his friends do not need him and Willow complains that Buffy does not accept Tara, revealing their relationship, for the first time, to Xander and Giles. While Giles goes to sleep the alcohol off, Buffy leaves, telling her friends that she does not need them as she has someone else she can depend on – little realizing that Riley has gone to Adam's lair.

Critical reception
A commenter for Critically Touched Reviews praised "the successful payoff we've been waiting for all season," an "extremely well acted" and "potent" argument scene at the end, and "great characterization;" he described some scenes as "very funny and well-written" and "simply wonderful."

Noel Murray of The A.V. Club, whose "Community Grade" gave the episode an A−, wrote, "The first fifteen minutes of The Yoko Factor is like the Inglourious Basterds of Buffy episodes, offering six long, winding, evenly paced conversations, punctuated by a quiet interlude and a kitschy-but-oddly-moving musical number... [T]he episode is always at its strongest when people are just talking to each other, either because they're enjoying each other's company or trying to figure out each other out [sic]. It's nice, for example, that... writer Doug Petrie found time to show Willow and Tara talking about their plans for sophomore year, while playing with the cutest kitten ever born." While he thought "this crossover seemed a little forced," he also "felt like all the extended chatter in The Yoko Factor rang essentially true."

Two reviewers for the BBC Buffy review pages said, "This [is] what we've been waiting for. No, not the culmination of the Initiative plot. Riley vs Angel: mano a vampo. The five star celebrity un-death match... It's all great fun" and "A very cunning and different episode from Doug Petrie. Yes, Adam may still be a bit pants as a villain, but it's great seeing him and Spike plan to destroy Buffy by making her friends fight. Suddenly, all the little quirks of this season - Xander's jobs, Giles's drinking, Tara and Willow - all come together in a big, messy splat of a squabble. Magnificent stuff. It's also really great seeing Angel back in Buffy - even if it is just to see him pummelling and smirking at Riley."

References

External links

 

Buffy the Vampire Slayer (season 4) episodes
2000 American television episodes
Buffyverse crossover episodes